In Canadian folklore, the Turtle Lake Monster is an entity purportedly inhabiting Turtle Lake, in West Central Saskatchewan Canada. The Monster is usually described as a creature 3–9 metres long, scaly or smooth, with no dorsal fin and a head resembling a dog, a seahorse or pig.
Natives are said to be nervous about the attention the Monster might bring and say its simply a massive Sturgeon that left his home and lives in Turtle Lake.
About once a year someone claims to have had an encounter with the beast. Reports date back to pre-settlement days when the local Cree had a legend about people who ventured into the monster's territory vanishing without a trace. There is speculation that the Monster sightings may be attributed to sightings of an unusually large lake sturgeon, or a relict population of prehistoric plesiosaurs.

There was also a report  of man seeing the creature while on the Lake with his grandson and daughter.
They say they saw the Monster about 12 metres away, saying "Its head came up, its back came up and it sort of rolled over we never saw the tail and its head looked like a seahorse."

Gord Sedgewick - Fisheries Biologist, Ministry of Environment has written:  Much has been reported and written over the years about the Turtle Lake “monster” (although nothing has been reported in recent years).  Over the years, people fishing in the open water have reported sightings of a big “thing” swimming near their boat.  Could it have been a lake sturgeon?  Lake sturgeon inhabit the Saskatchewan River system, and the outflow from Turtle Lake flows via the Turtle River directly into the North Saskatchewan River.  It is not inconceivable during some years of very high outflow that sturgeon could have found their way from the North Saskatchewan up the Turtle River and into Turtle Lake.  Sturgeon have a very long life span, so the few that may have entered the lake could have stayed there for many decades.  And of course, the longer they lived in the lake, the larger they grew.  Sturgeon are bottom feeding fish, so they wouldn’t often be sighted near the surface. The presence of a few lake sturgeon is the most plausible explanation for the numerous reported sightings of a “monster” swimming in the waters of Turtle Lake.  Having said this, sturgeon have never been caught in any test netting surveys, nor in any commercial fishing nets, so there is no conclusive evidence of their presence in the lake.  However, there are similarities between Turtle Lake and Candle Lake in regard to their connection to the Saskatchewan River system; in the case of Candle Lake, a few large lake sturgeon have actually been caught which verifies they were able to find their way upstream and take up residence in the lake.  But for Turtle Lake we’ll likely never know for sure!

References

Canadian folklore
Culture of Saskatchewan
Canadian legendary creatures